Daroji Sloth Bear Sanctuary is located in Ballari district in Karnataka. This is Asia's first sloth bear Sanctuary. The sanctuary was created exclusively for the conservation of the sloth bear. It is about 50 km from Ballari and about 15 km from the World Heritage Site Hampi. The area between Daroji in Sandur taluka and Ramasagar of Hospet Taluk is host to numerous sloth bears.

In October 1994, the Government of Karnataka, declared 5587.30 hectares of the Bilikallu Forest Reserve as Daroji Bear Sanctuary. 15 years later, in October 2009, the government added 2685.50 hectares of the Bukkasagara Forest Reserve to the sanctuary. This resulted in the overall area to increase from 5587.3 hectares to 8272.8 hectares.

The sanctuary is open between 14:00 and 18:00 every day. There is a watchtower within the sanctuary, opposite Karadikallu Gudda, that provides a vantage point to view the bears descending from the adjacent hillocks during evening hours.

Mythology
Kishkindha, the historical kingdom of Sugriva described in the Ramayana, is believed to be located on the bank of the Tungabhadra river. In the war against Ravana, Kishkinda, the monkey kingdom of Sugriva, was Rama’s ally. When Rama’s army crossed Hampi en route to Lanka, they met Jambavantha, a bear who joined the army.

Flora & Fauna
The flora of this sanctuary is primarily dry deciduous scrub and Southern thorn forests. At the time of declaration of the sanctuary, it was a large area of barren hillocks, but persistent efforts from Karnataka Forest Department have transformed the area into lush green forest, filled with local flora.

The sanctuary's flagship species is the Indian sloth bear (Melursus ursinus). It has a very stable population of sloth bears and they reside in the numerous caves found in the hillocks within the sanctuary. leopards, monitor lizards, mongoose, pangolins, star tortoises etc. are some of the other animals that abound in the sanctuary.

Threats
The bears are threatened due to illegal mining in fragmented areas of the adjoining forests. The forest department and NGOs have also rescued many domestic bears from Daroji and surrounding areas.  The age old practice of capturing a bear cub (claws are pulled out and male cubs are castrated) and domestication by Kalandars has reduced to a great extent, due to laws declaring them illegal. The domesticated bears were taken from home to home across villages and made to dance according to the direction of the Kalandars.

External links

 http://www.junglelodges.com/sloth-bear-resort
 http://jresearchbiology.com/documents/RA0330.pdf
 https://web.archive.org/web/20160225062532/http://jresearchbiology.redolences.com/documents/RA0331.pdf

References 
"An assessment of Floristic Diversity of Daroji Sloth Bear Sanctuary, Hospet, Bellary District, Karnataka, India". http://jresearchbiology.com/documents/RA0330.pdf

"Butterfly fauna of Daroji Sloth Bear Sanctuary, Hospet, Bellary District, Karnataka". https://web.archive.org/web/20160225062532/http://jresearchbiology.redolences.com/documents/RA0331.pdf

Tourist attractions in Ballari district
Wildlife sanctuaries in Karnataka
1984 establishments in Karnataka
Protected areas established in 1984